TUNA can mean:

Tuna, a common name for a number of species of fish
Transurethral needle ablation of the prostate, also known by the acronym TUNA

See also 
 Tuna (disambiguation)